Bagh-e Khvajeh (also Romanized as Bāgh-e Khvājeh; also known as Kalāt-e Bāgh-e Khvājeh, Deh Khvājeh, Khvājeh, and Khwāja) is a village in Doreh Rural District, in the Central District of Sarbisheh County, South Khorasan Province, Iran. At the 2006 census, its population was 87, in 26 families.

References 

Populated places in Sarbisheh County